Kevin Henrikson is a San Francisco-based engineer, speaker, and investor. Henrikson has worked for or headed several companies, such as Zimbra, Alpha Brand Media and Acompli.

Career
Henrikson earned his Bachelor of Science in mechanical engineering from University of California, Los Angeles (UCLA) in 2000. 

At Zimbra, Henrikson served as the Director of Engineering and managed the development of Zimbra Advanced Client (AJAX based) and Standard Client (JSP/HTML based). Zimbra was acquired by Yahoo! in 2007 for $350 million, which later sold it to VMware. Henrikson then left Zimbra after Yahoo! acquired it and then worked for VMware before leaving to serve as an entrepreneur in residence at Redpoint Ventures. 

Henrikson served as the Vice President of Engineering at Acompli, which he co-founded with JJ Zhuang, and raised $7.3 million in funding for its mobile app product. Acompli was acquired 18 months later by Microsoft for $200 million in 2014 and is now Outlook Mobile. Henrikson served as Partner Director of Engineering with Microsoft until joining Instacart in 2018 as their VP of Engineering.  Henrikson is also an angel investor, including having helped raise over $1.1 million for the Ministry of Supply.

Henrikson has served as a speaker for various technology related conferences.

References

External links

American computer businesspeople
American technology chief executives
Engineers from California
UCLA Henry Samueli School of Engineering and Applied Science alumni
People from San Francisco
Living people
Year of birth missing (living people)